Co-pilot refers to the first officer (civil  aviation), also known as the second pilot (sometimes referred to as the "co-pilot") of an aircraft.

Co-pilot or copilot may also refer to:
"Co-Pilot" (song), song by Kristina Maria featuring Laza Morgan and Corneille
Co-pilot Glacier, a short, steep tributary glacier, flowing from the slopes of Mount Overlord to the upper part of Aviator Glacier in Victoria Land, New Zealand
Die Liebe und der Co-Pilot, East German romantic comedy film directed by Richard Groschopp
God Is My Co-Pilot (book), a 1943 memoir by General Robert Lee Scott Jr.
God Is My Co-Pilot (film), a 1945 film based on the above book
God Is My Co-Pilot (band), a band from New York City
Newark Co-Pilots, earlier minor league baseball team based in Newark, New York 
Performance Co-Pilot, also known as PCP, an open source tool for monitoring computer networks
GitHub Copilot, an artificial intelligence tool for programming assistance